Olcostephanus is an extinct ammonoid cephalopod genus belonging to the family Olcostephanidae. These fast-moving nektonic carnivores lived during the Cretaceous, from the  upper Valanginian to the lower Hauterivian age.

Species 
 Olcostephanus astierianus (d'Orbigny, 1840)
 Olcostephanus atherstoni Sharpe, 1856
 Olcostephanus bakeri Imlay, 1937
 Olcostephanus bosei Riedel, 1938
 Olcostephanus delicatecostatus Haas, 1960
 Olcostephanus detonii Rodighiero 1919
 Olcostephanus filifer Imlay, 1937
 Olcostephanus laticosta Gerth, 1925
 Olcostephanus paucicostatus Imlay, 1937
 Olcostephanus pecki Imlay, 1960
 Olcostephanus popenoei Imlay, 1960
 Olcostephanus prorsiradiatus Imlay, 1937
 Olcostephanus quadriradiatus Imlay, 1938
 Olcostephanus sanlazarensis Imlay, 1937

Distribution 
Fossils of species within this genus have been found in the Cretaceous sediments of Antarctica, Argentina, Austria, Bulgaria, Chile, Colombia (Macanal Formation, Eastern Ranges), Czech Republic, France, Hungary, Italy, Mexico, Morocco, Poland, Portugal, Romania, Slovakia, South Africa, Spain, Russia, United States, as well as in the Jurassic of Argentina.

References

Bibliography 
 

Ammonitida genera
Perisphinctoidea
Cretaceous ammonites
Ammonites of Europe
Ammonites of Africa
Ammonites of North America
Ammonites of South America
Cretaceous Argentina
Jurassic Argentina
Fossils of Argentina
Cretaceous Chile
Fossils of Chile
Cretaceous Colombia
Fossils of Colombia
Paja Formation
Fossil taxa described in 1875